Krananda extranotata is a moth in the subtribe Boarmiini of the family Geometridae first described by Louis Beethoven Prout in 1926, from specimens collected in Dutch New Guinea (Irianjaya), in the central Arfak mountains.

References

External links 

 Further specimen images

Boarmiini
Moths of Indonesia
Taxa named by Louis Beethoven Prout
Taxa described in 1926